The 1911–12 Hong Kong First Division League season was the 4th since its establishment.

Overview
King's Own Rifiles won the championship.

References
RSSSF

1911-12
1911–12 domestic association football leagues
1911 in Hong Kong
1912 in Hong Kong